Dekada '70 may refer to:

 Dekada '70 (novel), by Lualhati Bautista
 Dekada '70 (film), a 2002 Filipino drama film, based on the novel